Ayman Al Husaini is a Kuwaiti football midfielder who played for Kuwait in the 1996 Asian Cup. He also played for Kazma SC.

References

1967 births
1996 AFC Asian Cup players
Kuwaiti footballers
Living people
Asian Games medalists in football
Footballers at the 1994 Asian Games
Footballers at the 1998 Asian Games
Asian Games silver medalists for Kuwait
Asian Games bronze medalists for Kuwait
Association football midfielders
Medalists at the 1994 Asian Games
Medalists at the 1998 Asian Games
Kuwait international footballers
Kuwait Premier League players
Kazma SC players